Ciampa arietaria, the brown pasture looper, is a moth of the  family Geometridae. It is found in most of Australia, including Tasmania.

The wingspan is about 40 mm.

The larvae feed on various herbaceous plants, including Arctotheca calendula, Onopordum acaulon, Lupinus nanus, Medicago sativa, Erodium species and Zaluzianskya divaricata. They are considered a pest on pastures.

External links
Australian Faunal Directory
Australian Insects

Nacophorini
Moths of Australia
Taxa named by Achille Guenée
Moths described in 1857